Présilly is a commune in the Jura department in Bourgogne-Franche-Comté in eastern France. It is known for the ruins of a castle dating from the 11th and 14th centuries where every summer open air theatrical shows are organized in the summer. The castle is surrounded by a discovery trail to recall what castle life was like.

Population

See also
Communes of the Jura department

References

External links
 Some Photos from "Les Miserables" show at the castle ruins
 Le Chateau de Presilly - History (in French)

Communes of Jura (department)